The 1987 1000 km Jerez was the second round of the 1987 World Sports-Prototype Championship.  It took place at the Circuito Permanente de Jerez, Spain on March 29, 1987.

Official results
Class winners in bold.  Cars failing to complete 75% of the winner's distance marked as Not Classified (NC).

Statistics
 Pole Position - #17 Rothmans Porsche - 1:29.190
 Average Speed - 147.817 km/h

References

 

Jerez
Jerez